Jan Halle (17 February 1903 – 6 January 1986) was a Dutch footballer. He played in two matches for the Netherlands national football team in 1929.

References

External links
 

1903 births
1986 deaths
Dutch footballers
Netherlands international footballers
Place of birth missing
Association footballers not categorized by position